Myrocarpus frondosus, the ibirá-payé, incienso, cabreúva or qu, is a species of flowering plant in the family Fabaceae. It is found in Argentina, Brazil, and Paraguay. It is threatened by habitat loss.

References

Amburaneae
Data deficient plants
Taxonomy articles created by Polbot